Ignacio "Nacho" Castillo Ameyugo (born 3 July 2000) is a Spanish professional footballer who plays as a midfielder for CD Mirandés B.

Club career
Castillo was born in Miranda de Ebro, Burgos, Castile and León, and was a Deportivo Alavés youth graduate. He made his senior debut with the reserves on 31 March 2019, starting in a 2–0 Tercera División home win over Club Portugalete.

In July 2019, Castillo was sent to Alavés' partner team Club San Ignacio to play in the fourth tier. In 2021, he returned to the B-team, now also in the new Tercera División RFEF.

On 7 July 2022, Castillo signed for hometown side CD Mirandés and was initially assigned to the reserve team also in the fifth tier. He made his professional debut on 13 August, coming on as a second-half substitute for Nico Serrano in a 1–1 Segunda División home draw against Sporting de Gijón.

References

External links
 
 
 

2000 births
Living people
People from Miranda de Ebro
Sportspeople from the Province of Burgos
Spanish footballers
Footballers from Castile and León
Association football midfielders
Segunda División players
Tercera División players
Tercera Federación players
Deportivo Alavés B players
CD Mirandés B players
CD Mirandés footballers